Nader Sadek is an Egyptian-American artist. His death metal project gathers many well-known and emerging artists from the entire metal scene, focusing mostly on black and death metal. Sadek currently resides in New York City and has worked as a stage artist for Mayhem and Sunn O))), before he decided to create a supergroup of death metal musicians using contacts he gained through his career. Aside from his musical projects and his own art, Sadek produces and directs music videos, most notably, Morbid Angel's "Garden of Disdain", Incantation, Inquisition, Nordjevel, Alkaloid, and more.

History
The project was created by Sadek's desire to bring his philosophical perception of petroleum usage to the public eye. The project released their debut album, In the Flesh, on May 16, 2011, in Europe and a day later in America.

Band members

Current members
Nader Sadek – songwriting, concepts, direction, vocals 
Glen Benton - vocals 
Attila Csihar - vocals 
Seth Van De Loo - vocals 
Hannes Grossmann – drums 
Derek Roddy – drums 
Septimiu Hărşan - drums 
Dominic Lapointe – bass 
Richie Brown - guitar 
Jim Ross - guitar 
Benoît "Barby" Claus  - bass

Live members
Richie Brown – guitar 
Seth Van De Loo - vocals 
Andreas Kisser – guitar 
Bobby Koelble – guitar 
Sean Frey –  guitar 
Mike Lerner – guitar 
Nicholas McMaster – bass guitar 
Rohit Chaturvedi – guitar 
Kevin Paradis – Drums

Former members
Steve Tucker – vocals 
Tony Norman - lead guitar  
Marcin "Novy" Nowak – bass guitar 
Rune "Blasphemer" Eriksen – guitar 
Flo Mounier – drums 
Travis Ryan – vocals 
Marcin Rygiel – bass guitar 
Tom Geldschläger – guitar

Discography
 Albums
 In the Flesh (2011)

EPs
 The Malefic: Chapter III (2014)
 The Serapeum (2020)

DVDs
 Living Flesh (2013)

Music videos (all directed by Nader Sadek)
"Nigredo In Necromance" (2011)
"Sulffer" (2011)
"Re:Mechanic" (2014)
"Deformation by Incision" (2014)
"Entropy Eternal" Sample (2014)

References

External links

Official website

Technical death metal musical groups
Musical groups established in 2011
Season of Mist artists
2011 establishments in the United States